Leucopogon verticillatus, or tassel flower, is the tallest epacrid in Western Australia.  Its striking form and similarity to bamboo made it the first Western Australia export to Japan, where it is used in flower arrangement. It was one of the many species  authored by Scottish botanist Robert Brown, appearing in his 1810 work Prodromus Florae Novae Hollandiae et Insulae Van Diemen.

The leaves form whorls around the stalk separated by gaps of 3–6 cm.  The leaves are a light green to yellow-orange in colour and have clear veins.  The small flowers form tassels of pink or red.  It grows in heavy soils in karri, jarrah, tingle and similar forests in the south-west botanical province.  The plant is an understorey plant and likes partial shade, although it can tolerate full sun if sufficient water is available.

Cultivation
Tassel flower is difficult to keep in cultivation.  It strikes only very slowly and seed has not been successful.  It may be necessary to use soils high in laterite or to provide appropriate leaf-litter to maintain a mycorrhizal fungus.

References

External links

verticillatus
Ericales of Australia
Eudicots of Western Australia
Garden plants